Adnan al-Bakkour is the former Attorney General for the Syrian province Hama, who resigned during the violent crackdown on protesters in the 2011 Syrian uprising.

References

Attorneys general

Year of birth missing (living people)
Living people
People from Hama